No. 17 Group RAF was a group of the Royal Air Force which was operational during both the First and Second World Wars.

During the First World War, the Group was formed during April 1918 in No. 4 Area, it was transferred to North-Eastern Area on 8 May, 1918, with Training being added to the name on 8 August 1918 and was disbanded on 18 October 1919.

Second World War
The group was reformed on 1 Dec 1936 as No. 17 (Training) Group in RAF Coastal Command.

Units 3 September 1939 
No. 17 Group RAF (T), under command of Air Commodore T.E.B. Howe, CBE, AFC

Units 1 November 1940 

No. 17 Group RAF (T), under command of Air Commodore T.E.B. Howe, CBE, AFC

The Flying Boat Training Squadron was formed on 2 January 1939 at RAF Calshot flying Supermarine Stranraers and Supermarine Scapas. It was disbanded and merged with the Seaplane Training Squadron to form No. 4 (Coastal) Operational Training Unit on 16 March 1941.

By 12 February 1942 the group had come under the command of Air Commodore H.G. Smart, CBE, DFC, AFC.

No. 131 (Coastal) Operational Training Unit formed in July 1942 at RAF Killadeas as part of No. 15 Group to train crews on the Consolidated Catalina. Two years later it had shifted into No. 17 Group.

Units 6 June 1944 
The following units were under its control:

 No. 4 (Coastal) Operational Training Unit RAF (Shorts Sunderland flying boats)
 No. 5 Operational Training Unit RAF
 No. 6 Operational Training Unit RAF
 No. 7 Operational Training Unit RAF
 No. 9 Operational Training Unit RAF
 No. 131 Operational Training Unit RAF, RAF Killadeas (Catalina flying boats)
 No. 132 Operational Training Unit RAF, RAF East Fortune - formed in November 1942 as part of No. 17 Group to train long-range fighter and strike training using the Bristol Blenheim, Bristol Beaufighter, and later, de Havilland Mosquito.
 No. 1674 Heavy Conversion Unit RAF, RAF Aldergrove, Northern Ireland
 No. 17 Group Communication Flight RAF - formed August 1938 at Gosport and was disbanded on 18 September 1945 at RAF Turnhouse.

The group disbanded on 1 September 1945.

Notes

References 
 Ashworth, Chris. RAF Coastal Command: 1936–1969. Patrick Stephens Ltd. 1992. 

017
Military units and formations disestablished in 1945